Green Lake Park may refer to:

 Green Lake Park, a park surrounding Green Lake (Seattle), United States
 Green Lake (Kunming) or Green Lake Park, an urban park in Kunming, Yunnan Province, China
 Green Lake Provincial Park, a provincial park in British Columbia, Canada
 Green Lakes State Park, Onondaga County, New York, United States